Hemichromis fasciatus, also called the banded jewelfish and five-spot cichlid, is a species of fish in the cichlid family. It is distributed throughout West Africa. It can also be found in the Nile Basin, Lake Chad, and the upper Zambezi.

Description
The banded jewelfish is yellow-green with a bronze iridescence and has five large, black, glossy oval patches on the side of the body. Older specimens have a brick-red dot on each scale. The mouth is large and wide. They are incredibly aggressive and will act like any other Jewelfish. If keeping these animals in an aquarium, your best chance is a large tank (75 gallon+), and with plenty of cover. Limit the selection of fish to one large adult or several small juveniles. Keep in mind you will have to separate them once they get too big, or they will kill each other.

References

External links
 Banded Jewelfish
 Hemichromis fasciatus

Fish of Africa
fasciatus
Taxa named by Wilhelm Peters
Fish described in 1857